The Pemba green pigeon (Treron pembaensis) is a species of bird in the family Columbidae. It is endemic to
Pemba, Tanzania.

Its natural habitats are subtropical or tropical moist lowland forests, plantations, and rural gardens. It is threatened by habitat loss.

References

External links
BirdLife Species Factsheet.

Treron
Endemic birds of Tanzania
Pemba Island
Birds described in 1940
Taxonomy articles created by Polbot
Northern Zanzibar–Inhambane coastal forest mosaic